The Memphis Botanic Garden is a   botanical garden located in Audubon Park at 750 Cherry Road, Memphis, Tennessee.

Memphis Botanic Garden is open to the public daily, where guests can take a stroll through various gardens on the grounds. There is also a children's garden, called my Big Backyard, which is very popular with Memphians and out of towners.

Memphis Botanic Garden hosts many community events each year, such as the Daffodil Dash Race, The Family Egg Hunt, and Mother's Day Jazz Brunch. The garden also offers a range of educational programs for youth and adults.  Plant sales and a concert series are held throughout the year to benefit its educational and horticultural programs.

History
The gardens have gradually been established in Audubon Park from 1953 onwards, including the creation of an arboretum (1957) and magnolia garden (1958), as well as the movement of an existing rose garden to the area (1958).

The Goldsmith Civic Garden Center, housing the Garden's administrative offices, an auditorium and the Water Garden Room, was completed and dedicated in 1964. The gardens were formally named the Memphis Botanic Garden in 1966.

Gardens
Today the garden contains 23 specialty gardens, including:
 Tennessee Bicentennial Iris Garden - hundreds of varieties of bearded irises, plus other iris types from Louisiana, Japan, Siberia and Spuria.
 Conifer Collection (1981) - including many dwarf conifer varieties.
 Herb Garden (2011) - over 500 types of herbs.
 Japanese Garden of Tranquility (1965, 1989) - designed by Dr. P. T. Tono, Tokyo; redesigned by Dr. Koichi Kawana.
 Rose Garden - 75 rose varieties.
 Sensory Garden (1989)
 Anne Heard Stokes Butterfly Garden (1997)
 Memphis Garden Club Water Garden

Honors
The Garden has several unique features and was recently certified as a Level 4 Arboretum, the highest designation,  making it one of four in Tennessee.

In 2006, the Garden's Hosta Trail was recognized by the American Hosta Society as one of fifteen nationally certified trails in the U.S. and one of two certified trails in the South.

Charity
Charity Navigator has awarded the Memphis Botanic Garden as a Four Star Charity making it in the top 14% of all non profit organizations in the U.S. for financial management.

In 2006, the Memphis Botanic Garden became a Blue Star Memorial Garden in cooperation with the National Garden Clubs.

See also 
 List of botanical gardens in the United States
 Memphis, Tennessee

Gallery

References

External links 
 Memphis Botanic Garden
 History of the Memphis Botanic Garden

Botanical gardens in Tennessee
Parks in Memphis, Tennessee
Japanese gardens in the United States
Protected areas established in 1953
1953 establishments in Tennessee